The 1964 Boston College Eagles football team represented Boston College as an independent during the 1964 NCAA University Division football season. Led by third-year head coach Jim Miller, the Eagles compiled a record of 6–3. Boston College played home games at Alumni Stadium in Chestnut Hill, Massachusetts.

Schedule

References

Boston College
Boston College Eagles football seasons
Boston College Eagles football
1960s in Boston